John MacDonald, known as Iain Lom (c. 1624–c. 1710) was a Scottish Gaelic poet.

Biography
Iain Lom's family were of the MacDonalds of Keppoch.  In Gaelic society, since there might often be a number of men with the same first names in any given clan, they were given sobriquets which might be based on a peculiar characteristic or feature.  "Lom" is Scots Gaelic for "bald" or "bare" (lom a., comparative form luime, bare, bald, shaven, cropped), perhaps indicating he was bald. However, in Gaelic idiom, it can also mean one who is very plain-spoken, an idiom which perhaps can best be related in English to the term "bare-faced" (though this is now generally applied only to liars). He was also known as Iain Manntach which translates as "stammering John," perhaps from a speech impediment.

His family held land as tacksmen at Allt a' Chaorainn, near the present day Laggan dam.
A ruin near the road is locally known as Iain Lom's house.

His dates of birth and death are unknown, but we know that he was present at (and composed a song about) the Battle of Inverlochy (1645) as an adult, and the Treaty of Union (1707); this would presume a birthdate in the early-mid-1620s (if not earlier), and a death in the early 18th century. Most of the few details we have of his life are known from contemporary comments, and from his poetry.

There is a tradition that he attended the Scots seminary at Valladolid in Spain as a youth and was expelled for some failing or indiscretion. Some suggest that Lom maybe a reference to a tonsure.

He was apparently somewhat disabled, and was once described by a contemporary as "walking with a hirple" (i.e., a limp.  Scots word originally used in 1450 by the Scots poet Robert Henryson, perhaps derived from the Old Norse word herpast "suffer from cramps").This, however, is somewhat at odds with the tradition that it was Iain Lom who walked from Brae Lochaber to Cille Chumein (now renamed Fort Augustus) to warn Montrose of the arrival of Argyll at Inverlochy and then guided the Jacobite army up Glen Turret and over the snow-covered hills into Glen Roy to surprise Argyll at Inverlochy on 2 February 1645. John Buchan described this as "that flank march which is one of the great exploits in the history of British arms". Montrose's own son died a month later as a result of this desperate march. It is believed that Iain Lom accidentally killed his own brother at a skirmish on Loch Tayside (Sròn a’ Chlachain), a battle in which his father was also killed. Thereafter he refused to draw a sword. When offered one by Alasdair Mac Colla at Inverlochy he declined saying "Cathaichibh sibhse 's innse mise" (You fight and I'll narrate). His long narrative poemLà Inbhir Lochaidh (Day of Inverlochy) is regarded as one of the treasures of the Gaelic language and an important historical source regarding the battle.

His supposed lameness didn't stop him from climbing a tree during the battle of Inverlochy.  When chastized for his seeming cowardice by his chief afterwards, he is said to have replied that he had climbed the tree the better to see his chief and clansmens' valiant deeds, and had he been killed in the battle, who would then have composed poetry about them?

There are many stories told of his quick and vitriolic wit, which apparently was demonstrated from an early age. He was a man of strong passions, none of which exceeded his hatred of Clan Campbell, as is evident from the following from Là Inbhir Lochaidh (The Day of Inverlochy)

It is widely believed that Robert Burns was Scotland's first Poet Laureate.  However, Charles II named Iain Lom poet laureate during his reign, and a later MacDonald poet, Alasdair mac Mhaighstir Alasdair ("Alexander, son of the teacher Alexander") was later appointed poet laureate by Prince Charles Edward Stuart, the de jure Prince Regent, during the 1745 Jacobite Rising, but as the Stuart line was unseated in 1689, and the subsequent Jacobite Risings failed to permanently restore the Stuarts, their status became a moot point.  Their stature has further been diminished by the fact that they composed exclusively in Gaelic, which even at that time was a language in decline.

Iain Lom was almost single-handedly responsible for bringing the Keppoch murderers to justice. When Dòmhnall Glas II (Grey Donald II)died his heir, Alasdair was too young to rule. The clan was governed by Alasdair Buidhe (yellow haired Alexander), uncle to the heir, until the young chief and his brother, Raghnall, returned from their education in Rome. A banquet was held in their honour at which both boys were murdered by 7 men (a father and his sons) from a branch of the family that coveted the chiefship. Iain Lom appealed to MacDonnell of Glen Garry to administer justice but achieved nothing. He then had to go into exile and appealed to Sir James MacDonald of Sleat to avenge the murder. This finally happened in 1665. The guilty party were surprised and killed at a house near Inverlair. Iain Lom is said to have decapitated the bodies with the dirk used in the murders. He took these grisly trophies to show to Glen Garry, as reproof for his earlier failure to do his duty. On his way he stopped at Loch Oich side and washed the heads at Tobar nan Ceann (The Well of the Heads) where a monument was later erected. He told the story in Murt na Ceapaich (The Keppoch murders) 

The Bard is also believed to have been present at the Battle of Killiecrankie in 1689 when he would have been in his mid-sixties. Two poems about the battle are attributed to him although it has been suggested that one of these may have been written by his son. Cath Raon Ruairidh, the Gaelic name for Killiecrankie, is sited as evidence that Dundee was shot just below his breast plate, and not, as later suggested by Professor Terry, in his left eye. Iain Lom dismissed William of Orange as "a borrowed king" and condemned Mary for her disloyalty to her father. The Massacre of Glen Coe was roundly condemned in Murt Ghlinne Comhann. Iain Lom's suggested punishment for the murder of his MacDonald kinsfolk was that the Campbell land in its entirety should be transferred to Clan Donald. Oran an Aghaidh an Aonaidh (A Song Against the Union) in which he condemned the Scottish aristocracy who had accepted union with England in 1707 is regarded as the last work that can be attributed to him and it is assumed that his death must have been soon afterwards.

Work
Iain Lom is representative of a switch from the ancient, classical tradition of Gaelic poetry to the vernacular poetry of the 17th century and later. Classical bards wrote mainly praise poems to their clan chiefs in the classical Gaelic that Scotland had once shared with Ireland. While Iain Lom's work has many features of the classical tradition he largely wrote in the everyday Gaelic of his time. A thoroughly political poet, he was a fierce opponent of the English Puritans and the Scottish Covenanters.  Later he opposed the accession of William of Orange and later governments.  He remained a loyal devotee of the Stuart family, and thus was an early Jacobite.  As a clan bard, he commented on the battles and engagements the Keppoch clan engaged in while campaigning for the Stuarts, especially under Great Montrose, as well as on contemporary matters.  His known works include the following:

 The Battle of Inverlochy
 Alasdair MacColla
 Keppoch murders
 The Massacre of Glencoe (in which MacDonald kinsmen were killed)
 The Restoration
 The Hanoverian succession
 Act of Union 1707 which removed Scottish sovereignty.

Family
Iain Lom had a sister who was married to Alexander MacDonald of Inverlair who was deeply implicated in the Keppoch murders. The bard omitted any mention of this in his work and seems to have remained on good terms with his sister.
While W.T. Kilgour says that he never married others say that he had a son, a good poet in his own right, who was killed in a skirmish at High Bridge by Dòmhnall Donn (Brown haired Donald) of Bohuntin, a bard with family ties to the Keppoch Murderers. Dòmhnall Donn was a famous cattle rustler and when he was awaiting execution in Inverness Iain Lom, a man of influence, made no move to help him.

Burial
Iain Lom is believed to be buried on the churchyard of Cille Choiril, east of Roy Bridge and near his home at Allt a' Chaorainn. The exact location of his grave is unknown but Charles Fraser-Mackintosh erected a fine memorial stone there to him in the late 19th century.

In Fiction
Iain Lom features as a character in Neil Munro's novel of the Little Wars of Lorn, John Splendid (1898).

References

Further reading
 Orain Iain Luim; the Songs of John MacDonald, bard of Keppoch, edited by Annie M. Mackenzie, Edinburgh, 1964.

17th-century Scottish Gaelic poets
Scottish Jacobites
Jacobite poets
Jacobite propagandists
Clan Donald
Clan MacDonald of Keppoch
Scottish Catholic poets
17th-century Scottish people
18th-century Scottish people
1620s births
1710s deaths
18th-century Scottish Gaelic poets